Michael Keith Nunes (28 January 1918 – 17 February 1996) was a Jamaican sailor. He competed in the Dragon event at the 1972 Summer Olympics.

References

External links
 

1918 births
1996 deaths
Jamaican male sailors (sport)
Olympic sailors of Jamaica
Sailors at the 1972 Summer Olympics – Dragon
Sportspeople from Kingston, Jamaica
20th-century Jamaican people